Ymyyakhtakh (Imıyaxtaax) is a rural locality (a selo), the only inhabited locality, and the administrative center of Edeysky Rural Okrug of Namsky District in the Sakha Republic, Russia, located  from Namtsy, the administrative center of the district. Its population as of the 2010 Census was 1,219, of whom 617 were male and 602 female, up from 1,157 as recorded during the 2002 Census. Ymyakhtakh is what English-speakers would call a village.

Location
The village is located within several hundred feet of the Lena river of Siberia, on its western bank. The location is also an archaeological site, associated with the same-named culture, known as the Ymyyakhtakh culture. This was a chalcolithic culture that had expanded northeastward from the Lake Baikal area in the late second-millennium BCE.

References

Notes

Sources
Official website of the Sakha Republic. Registry of the Administrative-Territorial Divisions of the Sakha Republic. Namsky District. 

Rural localities in Namsky District